Anaximenes may refer to:
Anaximenes of Lampsacus (4th century BC), Greek rhetorician and historian
Anaximenes of Miletus (6th century BC), Greek pre-Socratic philosopher
Anaximenes (crater), a lunar crater

Human name disambiguation pages